Peter Gregory McGehee (October 6, 1955 – September 13, 1991) was an American-born Canadian novelist, dramatist and short story writer.

Born in Pine Bluff, Arkansas to Frank Thomas and Julia Ann May McGehee, Peter moved with his family to Little Rock when he was six. He was the second of three children. McGehee played the trombone at Parkview High School in Little Rock where he graduated in 1973. McGehee studied at Southern Methodist University in Dallas before moving to San Francisco to work in theatre. While living in San Francisco, he wrote his first play and first comedic musical revue The Quinlan Sisters, and later met Canadian activist Douglas Wilson, who became his partner. He moved to Saskatoon in 1980 to be with Wilson, and subsequently the couple moved to Toronto in 1982. However, due to the lack of recognition afforded to same-sex marriage at the time, he often faced potential deportation because of his citizenship status, twice entering marriages of convenience with female friends. He briefly moved to New York City in 1984, but had returned to Toronto by 1986.

He published his first novella, Beyond Happiness, with Stubblejumper Press in 1985, and premiered his second revue, The Fabulous Sirs, in 1987.

In 1988, McGehee and Wilson were both diagnosed HIV-positive. McGehee subsequently wrote two novels, Boys Like Us and Sweetheart, and a book of short stories, The IQ Zoo. Boys Like Us was published in 1991, shortly before McGehee's death of AIDS-related causes; Sweetheart and The IQ Zoo were both published posthumously. The novels focused on the life of Zero MacNoo, a character who much like McGehee himself was an American living in Toronto, and his family and circle of friends.

Using notes that McGehee had written in preparation for his third novel, Wilson subsequently wrote Labour of Love before his own death in 1992. That novel was published in 1993.

Books
 Beyond Happiness (1985)
 Boys Like Us (1991)
 The IQ Zoo (1991)
 Sweetheart (1992)

References

1955 births
1991 deaths
20th-century American novelists
20th-century Canadian novelists
American male novelists
20th-century American dramatists and playwrights
Canadian male novelists
Canadian male short story writers
20th-century Canadian dramatists and playwrights
Canadian gay writers
Writers from Arkansas
Writers from Toronto
University of San Francisco alumni
Southern Methodist University alumni
AIDS-related deaths in Canada
American expatriate writers in Canada
People from Pine Bluff, Arkansas
American LGBT dramatists and playwrights
American LGBT novelists
Canadian LGBT dramatists and playwrights
Canadian LGBT novelists
American male short story writers
Canadian male dramatists and playwrights
American male dramatists and playwrights
20th-century Canadian short story writers
20th-century American short story writers
20th-century Canadian male writers
20th-century American male writers
20th-century Canadian LGBT people
American gay writers
Gay dramatists and playwrights
Gay novelists